Rudolf "Ruud" Stokvis (born 24 April 1943) is a retired rower from the Netherlands, who represented his native country twice at the Summer Olympics, starting in 1968. Four years later, he won a bronze medal in the coxless pairs alongside Roel Luynenburg. Stokvis also won a bronze medal in the coxless fours at the 1966 World Rowing Championships.

In 1978, Stokvis defended a PhD thesis on the ideological and organizational development of modern sports. He was then teaching sociology at the University of Amsterdam, including sports-related topics. He was also involved in research activities and published several books:

 125 jaar Koninklĳke Nederlandsche Studenten Roeibond (2008)
 Fitter, harder & mooier : de onweerstaanbare opkomst van de fitnesscultuur (Amsterdam/Antwerpen, 2008)
 Concurrentie en beschaving : ondernemingen en het commercieel beschavingsproces (Amsterdam, 1999)
 Sport, publiek en de media (Amsterdam, 2003)
 De sportwereld : een sociologische inleiding (Alphen aan den Rijn/Brussel, 1989)
 Ondernemers en industriële verhoudingen : een onderneming in regionaal verband (1945–1985) (Assen, 1989)
 Strijd over sport : organisatorische en ideologische ontwikkelingen (Deventer, 1979)

References

1943 births
Living people
Dutch male rowers
Rowers at the 1968 Summer Olympics
Rowers at the 1972 Summer Olympics
Olympic rowers of the Netherlands
Olympic bronze medalists for the Netherlands
Rowers from Amsterdam
Olympic medalists in rowing
University of Amsterdam alumni
World Rowing Championships medalists for the Netherlands
Medalists at the 1972 Summer Olympics
20th-century Dutch people